Nunavut is a federal electoral district in Nunavut, Canada, that has been represented in the House of Commons of Canada since 1979. Before 1997, it was known as Nunatsiaq, and was one of two electoral districts in Northwest Territories.

The riding covers the entire territory of Nunavut. It is the largest federal electoral district by land area in Canada, and since the abolition of the Division of Kalgoorlie in Western Australia, it is the second largest electoral district in the world after Yakutsk in Russia and the largest one represented by a single legislator.

Demographics
''According to the Canada 2021 Census; 2013 representation

Ethnic groups: 85.8% Indigenous, 10.6% White, 1.5% Black
Languages: 52.2% Inuktitut, 33% English, 1.4% French
Religions: 73.5% Christian (39.1% Anglican, 22.5% Catholic, 4% Pentecostal), 24.9% No religion 
Median income (2020): $37,600
Average income (2020): $57,200

The Nunavut riding holds a host of demographic records:

 Lowest median age: 24.1 years
 Highest percentage  of Indigenous peoples: 85.0%
 Highest percentage of Inuit: 84.0%
 Highest percentage of a non-official language as mother tongue: 69.4%
 Highest percentage of an Indigenous language as mother tongue: 68.0%
 Highest percentage of Inuktitut as mother tongue: 66.8%
 Highest percentage of an Indigenous language as home language: 53.0%
 Highest percentage of Inuktitut as home language: 51.9%

History
The riding was created in 1976 as "Nunatsiaq" from parts of the Northwest Territories riding. It was renamed  "Nunavut" in 1996.

In 1999, the district's boundaries were redefined in the Nunavut Act, the law governing the creation of Nunavut as a separate jurisdiction from the Northwest Territories.

The boundaries of this riding were not changed in the 2012 electoral redistribution.

Riding associations
Riding associations are the local branches of political parties:

Members of Parliament

This riding has elected the following Members of Parliament:

Election results

Nunavut

Nunatsiaq

See also
 List of Canadian federal electoral districts
 Past Canadian electoral districts

References

Notes

External links
 Riding history for Nunatsiaq (1976–1996) from the Library of Parliament
 Riding history for Nunavut (1996–1999) from the Library of Parliament
 Riding history for Nunavut (1999– ) from the Library of Parliament
 Expenditures - 2004
Expenditures – 2000
Expenditures – 1997
 Website of the Parliament of Canada

Nunavut federal electoral districts